Muhammad ibn Musa ibn Tulun was a member of the Tulunid dynasty and briefly governor of Tarsus.

He was appointed by his cousin, the Tulunid ruler Khumarawayh ibn Ahmad ibn Tulun, to replace Ahmad ibn Tughan al-Ujayfi as governor of Tarsus in early summer 892. On 18 August 892, however, he was deposed by an uprising of the populace of Tarsus, angry at a Tulunid attempt to imprison the local magnate Raghib and confiscate his property. Khumarawayh was forced to back down: Muhammad left the city, and Ahmad al-Ujayfi was restored as its governor.

References

Sources
 
 

Abbasid governors of Tarsus
Tulunids
9th-century Turkic people
Tulunid governors